This is a list of fellows of the Royal Society elected in its 15th year, 1674.

Fellows 
Sir Jonas Moore  (1617–1679)
Edmund Castell  (1606–1685)
Renatus Franciscus Slusius  (1622–1685)
Giovanni Battista Pacichelli  (1634–1695)
Henry Jenkes  (d. 1697)

References

1674
1674 in science
1674 in England